Second Verdict is a six-part BBC television series from 1976. It combines the genres of police procedural and docudrama, with dramatised documentaries in which classic criminal cases and unsolved crimes from history were re-appraised by fictional police officers. In Second Verdict, Stratford Johns and Frank Windsor reprised for a final time their double-act as Detective Chief Superintendents Barlow and Watt, hugely popular with TV audiences from the long-running series Z-Cars, Softly, Softly and Barlow at Large. Second Verdict built on the formula of their 1973 series Jack the Ripper in which dramatised documentary was drawn together with a discussion between the two police officers which formed the narrative. Second Verdict also allowed for some location filming and, when the case being re-appraised was within living memory, interviews with real witnesses.

The episodes were:

 "The Lindbergh Kidnapping" (27 May 1976)
 "Who Killed the Princes in the Tower?" (3 June 1976)
 "The French Bluebeard" (10 June 1976)
 "Murder on the 10.27" (17 June 1976)
 "Lizzie Borden" (24 June 1976) 
 "Who Burned the Reichstag?" (1 July 1976).

Although this was the last time Barlow and Watt would be seen together on British TV (and the last time Barlow would be seen at all), the Watt character would make one final appearance, in the last episode of Z-Cars in September 1978.

Cast 
Stratford Johns - (DCS Charlie Barlow)
Frank Windsor - (DCS John Watt)

See also
Julian Fellowes Investigates: A Most Mysterious Murder
Murder, Mystery and My Family

External links 

1976 British television series debuts
1976 British television series endings
1970s British police procedural television series
1970s British television miniseries
BBC television docudramas
English-language television shows
British television spin-offs